Mahanoro is a district of Atsinanana in Madagascar.

Communes
The district is further divided into 11 communes:

 Ambinanidilana
 Ambinanindrano
 Ambodibonara
 Ambodiharina
 Ankazotsifantatra
 Befotaka
 Betsizaraina
 Mahanoro
 Manjakandriana
 Masomeloka
 Tsaravinany

Rivers
The small Masora River (at Masomeloka)
 The Mangoro River (at Mahanoro).

References 

Districts of Atsinanana